Siarastaq (also Romanized as Sīārastāq) is a village in Siyarastaq Yeylaq Rural District, Rahimabad District, Rudsar County, Gilan Province, Iran. At the 2006 census, its population was 139, in 37 families.

References 

Populated places in Rudsar County